Mount Halcon and  is the highest mountain in the island of Mindoro in the Philippines, according to the new data release by Oriental Mindoro peakvisor as of 2022, it has an elevation of  above sea level, higher than the previous estimates data at . It is the 23rd-highest peak in the Philippines and 37th-highest peak of an island on Earth. Its steep slopes have earned it the reputation of being one of the most difficult and technically most challenging mountain to climb in the Philippines. The first documented ascent was made in 1906 by American botanist Elmer Drew Merrill and a party of forestry and military personnel.

Inhabitants
Mount Halcon is home to the indigenous Alangan Mangyans.

Flora and fauna
Its thick vegetation contains much flora and fauna, including the critically endangered Mindoro bleeding-heart which is endemic to the area, and the stick insect Conlephasma enigma, which was first described in 2012.

History
The mountain was also the location of a possible World War II Japanese holdout. Isao Miyazawa found evidence that his comrade Captain Fumio Nakahara was living there in 1957. Another search in 1977 was called off due to Miyazawa contracting malaria. In 1980, Miyazawa found Nakahara's hut, and the natives talked to him extensively about the foreigner. However, Nakahara himself has never been spotted.

See also
 List of Ultras of the Philippines
 List of islands by highest point

References

 "The Last Last Soldier?," TIME, January 13, 1975
 "Still fighting, 35 years after V-J day," Finger Lakes Times. April 10, 1980, p. 1.

External links
 "Philippine Mountains" Peaklist.org
 "Mount Halcon, Philippines" on Peakbagger

Halcon
Landforms of Oriental Mindoro